ValuJet Airlines, later known as AirTran Airlines after joining forces with AirTran Airways, was an ultra low-cost U.S. airline, headquartered in unincorporated Clayton County, Georgia, that operated regularly scheduled domestic and international flights in the Eastern United States and Canada during the 1990s. The company was founded in 1992 and was notorious for its sometimes dangerous cost-cutting measures. All of the airline's planes were purchased used from other airlines; very little training was provided to workers; and contractors were used for maintenance and other services. The company quickly developed a reputation for safety issues. In 1995, the military refused ValuJet's bid to fly military personnel over safety worries, and officials at the FAA wanted the airline to be grounded.

The crash of Flight 592 in 1996, which was caused by an on-board fire resulting from improperly stored hazardous materials on board, spelled doom for the airline. ValuJet was grounded the next month and not allowed to fly again until September of that same year, with a greatly reduced fleet. The airline's major customers never returned, and the company suffered major losses.

In 1997, ValuJet purchased the much smaller AirTran Airways. Although ValuJet was the nominal survivor, executives believed that a new name was important to regain passenger traffic, so the merged company adopted the AirTran name. After the merger, AirTran made little mention of its past as ValuJet. AirTran was purchased by Southwest Airlines in 2011 and ended flights in 2014.

History

Inception
ValuJet was founded in 1992 and began operations on October 26, 1993. It originally offered service from Atlanta to Orlando, Jacksonville, and Tampa with a single McDonnell Douglas DC-9 that previously belonged to Delta Air Lines.  The first flight, Flight 901, flew from Atlanta to Tampa. The carrier was headed by a group of industry veterans including co-founder and chairman Robert Priddy, who had started a string of successful airlines including Atlantic Southeast Airlines (ASA), Air Midwest, and Florida Gulf Airlines. Board members Maury Gallagher and Tim Flynn, the other co-founders, developed and ran WestAir before selling it to Mesa Airlines; former Continental Airlines and Flying Tigers President Lewis Jordan joined the carrier a short time later as president.

The airline went public in June 1994 after a year of tremendous growth with the addition of 15 aircraft since the first flight in 1993. It became the fastest airline to make a profit in the history of American aviation, earning $21 million in 1994 alone. In October 1995, ValuJet placed an order with McDonnell Douglas for 50 MD-95 jets (now known as the Boeing 717) with an option for 50 more. To keep costs low, the airline bought many used aircraft from around the world. At the time ValuJet's fleet was among the oldest in the United States, averaging 26 years. In 1995, the airline sued Delta Air Lines and TWA over landing slots.

Like most low-cost airlines, ValuJet did not own any hangars or spare parts inventories. However, many of the measures it took to hold down fares were very aggressive even by low-cost standards. For example, it required pilots to pay for their own training and only paid them after completed flights and also gave flight attendants only basic training.  It also outsourced many functions other airlines handle themselves. For instance, it subcontracted maintenance to several companies, and these companies in turn subcontracted the work to other companies. Whenever delays were caused by mechanics, ValuJet cut the pay of the mechanics working on that plane.

Safety problems
In August 1995, the United States Department of Defense (DoD) rejected ValuJet's bid to fly military personnel, citing serious deficiencies in ValuJet's quality assurance procedures.

The Federal Aviation Administration's (FAA) Atlanta field office sent a memo on February 14, 1996, to its headquarters in Washington, D.C., stating that "consideration should be given to an immediate FAR 121 re-certification of this airline"—in other words, the FAA wanted ValuJet grounded. ValuJet airplanes made 129 emergency landings: fifteen in 1994, 57 in 1995, and 57 from January through May 1996. In February, the FAA ordered ValuJet to seek approval before adding any new aircraft or cities to their network, something the industry had not seen since deregulation in 1979. This attempt at removing ValuJet's certification was "lost in the maze at FAA" according to NTSB Chairman Jim Hall.  By this time, ValuJet's accident rate was not only one of the highest in the low-fare sector, but was more than 14 times that of the legacy airlines.

Fallout from the crash of Flight 592
On May 11, 1996, ValuJet suffered its highest-profile accident when Flight 592, a DC-9 flying from Miami to Atlanta, crashed into the Florida Everglades, killing all 110 people on board. The crash was caused by an onboard fire triggered by full chemical oxygen generators that were illegally stowed in the cargo hold without their safety caps, by maintenance subcontractor SabreTech.  The resulting investigation revealed numerous systemic flaws, and ultimately faulted both SabreTech for storing the generators on the plane along with ValuJet for not supervising them.

After the crash, many of ValuJet's other cost-cutting practices came under scrutiny. One of its planes flew 140 times despite a leaky hydraulic system, and another flew 31 times with malfunctioning weather radar. Another plane was allowed to fly despite engine rust that went unnoticed during its refit; it caught fire a few months later and was completely destroyed. At the time of the crash, the FAA was in the final stages of a three-month review of ValuJet's operations. The Transportation Department originally wanted to give ValuJet a clean bill of health. However, due to strong objections from the department's Inspector General, Mary Schiavo, the FAA grounded ValuJet on June 11, 1996.

On September 26, 1996, ValuJet resumed flying with 15 jets, down from 52 before the crash, after complying with all DOT and FAA requirements. On November 4, 1996, ValuJet announced that Joseph Corr, former CEO of Continental Airlines, would become CEO and President at a time when the airline was in serious trouble. However, its highest-paying customers never returned, and it had lost $55 million since the crash of Flight 592.

After the large amount of negative publicity surrounding the Flight 592 incident, ValuJet suffered serious financial problems. On July 11, 1997, they announced that it would merge with the much smaller Airways Corporation, parent of AirTran Airways, which was completed on November 17, 1997. Airways Corporation was merged into the ValuJet holding company (ValuJet, Inc.) and the ValuJet holding company changed its name to AirTran Holdings; the ValuJet holding company, now AirTran Holdings, retained the ValuJet pre-1997 stock price history. In November 1997, AirTran Holdings announced it would move its headquarters from Atlanta to Orlando.

The holding company formerly with the ValuJet name renamed ValuJet Airlines to AirTran Airlines with all fleet and operations being transferred to AirTran Airways in 1998 and then merging into AirTran Airways in 1999; ValuJet Airlines ended its existence as AirTran Airlines. However, for years after the merger, the general public and the media thought ValuJet was the nominal survivor.

AirTran, prior to its purchase by Southwest, made no notable mention of the ValuJet past. Instead, AirTran kept a large cache of ValuJet memorabilia, including radio ads, locked in an Atlanta warehouse. AirTran also opted not to make any major announcements on the crash's tenth anniversary out of respect for the victims' families.

Fleet
ValuJet operated an all-McDonnell Douglas fleet of 98 aircraft consisting of McDonnell Douglas DC-9s, along with a few McDonnell Douglas MD-80s. The aircraft were fitted with orange seats. Most of the aircraft purchased were more than 15 years old, many obtained from other carriers. ValuJet had on average one of the oldest fleets in America, averaging 27 years. All the planes were painted white with blue and yellow trim, with the smiling "critter" painted on both sides of the plane on the front. ValuJet's FAA call sign was "critter" due to the airline's smiling airplane logo.

At the time of its demise the fleet consisted of:

 2 - McDonnell Douglas DC-9-21
 42 - McDonnell Douglas DC-9-32 (one crashed in 1996)
 1 - McDonnell Douglas MD-81
 2 - McDonnell Douglas MD-82
 1 - McDonnell Douglas MD-83 
 50 - McDonnell Douglas MD-95 (previously on order)

Destinations

ValuJet's main hub was in Atlanta, and their focus cities were Orlando, Philadelphia, Boston, Miami, and Washington Dulles. Before the crash of Flight 592, ValuJet operated to 22 cities in the U.S. and one in Canada. Most people chose ValuJet for their low fares, such as $39 tickets for a flight from Atlanta to Jacksonville.

Accidents and incidents

Flight 597

On June 8, 1995, a DC-9-32, was forced to abort its takeoff from Hartsfield Jackson Atlanta International Airport after a catastrophic engine failure which was caused by rusted engine components. ValuJet was aware of the problem, but did not have the budget to fix it and allowed the aircraft to keep flying. Shrapnel from the right engine penetrated the fuselage and the right engine main fuel line, and a cabin fire erupted. The airplane was stopped on the runway, and captain Greg Straessle, 45, ordered an evacuation of the airplane. The plane was on a scheduled flight to Miami International Airport.

The subsequent fire destroyed the aircraft. Among the five crew members, one flight attendant received serious puncture wounds from shrapnel and thermal injuries, and another flight attendant received minor injuries. Of the 57 passengers on board, five suffered minor injuries.

The National Transportation Safety Board (NTSB) determined that the engine failure was caused by a detectable crack in a compressor disk, on which a maintenance contractor had failed to perform a proper inspection and had kept poor records.  The incident resulted in the NTSB issuing an advisory recommending improvements to maintenance rules throughout the industry.

Flight 558
On Sunday January 7, 1996, ValuJet Airlines Flight 558, another DC-9-32, FAA registration N922VV, while on climb out from Hartsfield Jackson Atlanta International Airport, a malfunction in the ground shift mechanism, which detects when the aircraft is on the ground, prevented normal auto-pressurization of the cabin. Because of this, the crew pulled the Ground Control Relay (GCR) circuit breakers H20 and J20 to bypass the ground shift mechanism and commence normal pressurization. When on the final approach to Nashville International Airport's runway 02R  at 100 feet, the cabin was completely depressurized, so the captain reset the breakers, which activated the ground shift mechanism. As a result, the spoilers suddenly activated automatically, causing the jet to enter a high sink rate, striking the runway at full power and in a nose high attitude. Five people received minor injuries.

Flight 592

ValuJet Airlines Flight 592, another DC-9-32, crashed in the Florida Everglades on Saturday, May 11, 1996, due to a fire caused by the activation of chemical oxygen generators that were illegally shipped in the cargo hold by ValuJet's maintenance contractor, SabreTech. The fire damaged the airplane's electrical system and eventually overcame the crew, resulting in the deaths of all 110 people on board. The airplane was on its way from Miami to Atlanta.

See also 
 List of defunct airlines of the United States

References

External links

 Archive of the ValuJet website
 NTSB Aircraft Accident Report ValuJet Airlines Flight 558

Airlines established in 1993
Airlines disestablished in 1997
Companies based in Clayton County, Georgia
Defunct airlines of the United States
Defunct companies based in Georgia (U.S. state)
Defunct low-cost airlines